La Flor Airport  is an airport serving the La Flor hacienda in Guanacaste Province, Costa Rica.

See also

Transport in Costa Rica
List of airports in Costa Rica

References

External links
 OurAirports - La Flor Airport
 OpenStreetMap - La Flor
 HERE Maps - La Flor Airport
 FallingRain - La Flor Airport
 

Airports in Costa Rica
Guanacaste Province